Alastair Willis is a Grammy-nominated conductor and music director of the South Bend Symphony Orchestra. Willis is the brother of Berlin Philharmonic low horn player Sarah Willis.

References

External links

American male conductors (music)
Living people
Year of birth missing (living people)
Place of birth missing (living people)
21st-century American conductors (music)
21st-century American male musicians
People from Acton, Massachusetts